My Cousin Rachel is a 1952 American romantic mystery film directed by Henry Koster and starring Olivia de Havilland, Richard Burton, Audrey Dalton, Ronald Squire, George Dolenz and John Sutton. The film is based on the 1951 novel of the same name by Daphne du Maurier.

Twentieth Century-Fox obtained the rights to film the novel, with Burton's agreeing to star in a U.S. film for the first time. Production was troubled when du Maurier and original director George Cukor were dissatisfied with the adaptation, causing Cukor to leave the project.

My Cousin Rachel received some positive reviews upon its initial release, including for Burton's performance. It was nominated for four Academy Awards, and Burton won a Golden Globe for New Star of the Year.

Plot

On the coast of Cornwall, the boy Philip Ashley is raised by his older and wealthy cousin Ambrose on a large estate. When the weather in Cornwall threatens Ambrose's health, he leaves the estate for a warmer climate, making his way to Florence and leaving Philip behind with his godfather Nick Kendall. In Florence, Ambrose decides to marry his cousin Rachel. However, back in Cornwall, Philip receives disturbing letters from Ambrose, complaining of Rachel's treatment as well as that of the physicians taking care of him. Mr. Kendall believes Ambrose unsound of mind, raising the possibility that he has inherited his deceased father's brain tumour. When Philip travels to Florence, he meets a man named Guido Rainaldi, who tells him Ambrose has died of a brain tumour, producing a death certificate as proof, and that his will left the Cornwall estate to him upon his 25th birthday. Rachel, who left Florence the day before Philip arrived, has inherited nothing and has made no claim on the estate. Unconvinced, Philip suspects Rachel of murder and vows revenge.

Months later, after returning to Cornwall, Philip is informed by Mr. Kendall that Rachel has arrived in Cornwall for a visit. He invites her to the house and discovers she is different from what he imagined – she is beautiful, ladylike, and kind. At the end of the weekend, when she intends to leave, he shows her Ambrose's letters and admits he planned to accuse her of wrongdoing; but since he no longer suspects her, he throws the letters in the fireplace to demonstrate his faith in her. He later instructs his executor, Mr. Kendall, to award Rachel an extraordinarily generous allowance of £5,000 per annum, suggesting the money is hers anyway. Rachel responds with gratitude and warmth and stays at the estate for an extended period, despite gossip. Yet when Mr. Kendall tells Philip that Rachel has overdrawn her accounts, and that in Florence she was notorious for "loose" living, Philip rejects Nick's warnings and instead turns over the entire estate to Rachel on his 25th birthday. When the day arrives, he solicits from her a vague romantic promise, which she gives, and they passionately kiss. However, the next day when Philip announces to his friends that he and Rachel are engaged to be wed, Rachel dismisses the announcement as lunacy. Rachel later tells Philip that her promise did not mean marriage, that she will never marry him, and she only showed him love the previous night because of the wealth he gave her.

Emotionally devastated, Philip succumbs to bouts of fever and delirium, but Rachel nurses him back to health. In his fever, Philip imagines a wedding with Rachel, and wakes up three weeks later convinced they are married, and surprised to hear from the servants that she intends to move back to Florence. Before she leaves, Philip becomes convinced that Rachel is attempting to poison him and that she indeed murdered Ambrose. So great is his anger toward Rachel that he neglects to warn her about a foot bridge in need of repair at the edge of the estate. Instead, Philip and his friend Louise secretly rummage through Rachel's room for a letter from Rainaldi, assuming it will incriminate Rachel. Instead, upon discovering and reading the letter, they find out that Rainaldi merely discussed Rachel's affections for Philip and suggests she take Philip with her when visiting Florence. In the meantime, Philip finds Rachel has indeed suffered a fatal accident while crossing the unrepaired foot-bridge. With her last words, she asks Philip why he did not warn her of the danger. She then dies, leaving Philip to wonder for the rest of his life about his own implicit guilt as to the death of the innocent Rachel.

Cast

Production
Daphne du Maurier's agent initially attempted to sell an adaptation of My Cousin Rachel for $100,000, as well as 5% of the international box office. This offer was rejected by every major studio, with Twentieth Century-Fox instead obtaining the rights in September 1951 for $80,000. Fox also secured George Cukor as director. However, du Maurier and Cukor reviewed a screenplay draft and found it unfaithful to the novel, with du Maurier declaring it "Quite desperate." Cukor also disapproved of the comedic additions, and without achieving his desired revisions to the screenplay, opted to quit, with Fox's press release explaining his departure as being due to "artistic differences." Henry Koster later took over Cukor's role, with Burton's never learning whether Cukor was fired or had quit.

According to Burton, Cukor planned for either Greta Garbo or Vivien Leigh to star as Rachel. The part ultimately went to de Havilland, marking her first film role since The Heiress (1949). My Cousin Rachel also marked Richard Burton's first time starring in a U.S. film. Although uninterested in the novel or screenplay, Burton accepted the role due to his respect for Cukor, and he traveled to New York City for production. Background shots were filmed in Cornwall, where the story is set.

According to Koster, in one scene Burton had to climb around a house, but had difficulty and kept falling off it. Due to the fact that Burton repeatedly struck his head on the wall, Koster feared the blows could prove fatal, and the crew had to physically restrain Burton from retrying. Aside from the episode, Koster described Burton as calm towards him and de Havilland throughout production.

Before agreeing to appear in the movie, Burton was determined to hold out for a fee of 7,000 English pounds (at the time, about $18,000 USD). He was surprised to learn that Fox offered him $50,000. He accepted the offer, but later was disappointed with the behavior of his co-star de Havilland. She asked director Koster to inform everyone on the set that she was to be referred to as "Miss de Havilland" instead of the more informal "Livvie", a nickname that, until then, had been used by others when working with her.

Reception

Critical reception
Bosley Crowther, writing for The New York Times, declared the film to be an "excellent" adaptation of du Maurier's work, praising its suspense, atmosphere and Burton's performance. Variety'''s review positively reviewed the tone of the film and credited Burton for giving "a strong impression". Upon seeing the finished film, du Maurier was disappointed, enjoying Burton and the shots filmed in the real Cornwall, but feeling de Havilland's portrayal of Rachel lost the mystery that defined the character, and disliking her hairstyle, comparing it to Wallis Simpson's. Nevertheless, Cukor called de Havilland and congratulated her for a "brilliant" performance.

The 1999 Blockbuster Entertainment Guide to Movies and Videos awarded My Cousin Rachel four and a half stars, acclaiming it as "Atmospheric." In 2002, the American Film Institute nominated it for its AFI's 100 Years...100 Passions list. In his 2015 Movie Guide, Leonard Maltin gave the film three stars, assessing it as "Successful" as an adaptation.

Accolades
Burton was nominated for an Academy Award for the first time for My Cousin Rachel.

Legacy
Koster's film was the first adaptation of My Cousin Rachel''. A 1990 television version directed by Brian Farnham followed, with Professor Nina Auerbach judging it as a "Superficially" more faithful adaptation, including a more complex treatment of Rachel, played by Geraldine Chaplin.

The next cinematic adaptation was a 2017 film directed by Roger Michell and starring Rachel Weisz as the title character. The 2017 version followed a trend in du Maurier's works receiving new adaptations.

References

Bibliography

External links

 
 
 
 

1952 films
1950s historical romance films
1950s mystery films
1952 romantic drama films
20th Century Fox films
Films based on works by Daphne du Maurier
American black-and-white films
American mystery films
American romantic drama films
1950s English-language films
Films about cousins
Films directed by Henry Koster
Films set in Cornwall
Films set in the 19th century
Films scored by Franz Waxman
Films with screenplays by Nunnally Johnson
American historical romance films
1950s American films